Cheok Kon Fatt is a former Malaysian Paralympic weightlifter. He won silver at the 1992 Summer Paralympics in Barcelona.

References

External links 
 

Living people
Year of birth missing (living people)
Malaysian people of Chinese descent
Malaysian male weightlifters
Paralympic powerlifters of Malaysia
Paralympic silver medalists for Malaysia
Weightlifters at the 1992 Summer Paralympics
Medalists at the 1992 Summer Paralympics
Paralympic medalists in weightlifting
Commonwealth Games silver medallists for Malaysia
Commonwealth Games medallists in weightlifting
Weightlifters at the 2002 Commonwealth Games
20th-century Malaysian people
21st-century Malaysian people
Medallists at the 2002 Commonwealth Games